Events in the year 2009 in Liberia.

Incumbents 

 President: Ellen Johnson Sirleaf
 Vice President: Joseph Boakai
 Chief Justice: Johnnie Lewis

Events
 January 20 – The microfinance bank AccessBank Liberia is established.
 June 30 – The final, consolidated report of the Truth and Reconciliation Commission of Liberia is made public.
 July 26 – Bong County Paramount Chief Flomo Togbah Barworor becomes the first traditional leader to serve as national independence day orator, delivering his speech in the Kpelle language.
 April 30 – Former interim President Gyude Bryant is acquitted of embezzling $1.4 million from the transitional government.
 September 15 – United Nations Security Council Resolution 1885 is unanimously adopted, which extends the mandate of the United Nations Mission in Liberia until September 30, 2010.
 December 17 – United Nations Security Council Resolution 1903 is unanimously adopted, which adjusts the Liberian arms embargo and renews the travel ban on persons determined to be a threat to the peace process.

Deaths
 February 21 – Wilton Sankawulo, former National Transitional Chairman (1995–1996), in Monrovia (b. 1937)
 June 30 – Dorothy Musuleng-Cooper, former Minister of Foreign Affairs, in Monrovia (b. 1930)
 October 30 – Eugenia A. Wordsworth-Stevenson, former diplomat, in Olney, Maryland, U. S.

References 

 
2000s in Liberia
Years of the 21st century in Liberia
Liberia
Liberia